Shadows of Fear is a British anthology television series produced by Thames Television, which aired between 1970 and 1973.

Premise
The episode plots are largely thrillers, similar to each other in that characters in each episode have someone or something to fear. The series did not explore supernatural territory. The main focus remained on down-to-earth fear of the psychological, Hitchcockian type.

History
Very little has been recorded of the series' production history. Eleven episodes were produced; they were aired over a period of about two-and-a-half years. The first episode, broadcast in 1970, was followed by a season of nine episodes in early 1971. The final episode (thirty minutes long, rather than sixty) was broadcast nearly two years later in 1973. The series aired only once and was never repeated, until the autumn of 2019 when it began being shown on Talking Pictures TV.

Episodes

Availability
All eleven episodes were released on DVD in Region 2 in 2011.

References

1970s British anthology television series
1970s British drama television series
1970 British television series debuts
1973 British television series endings
Television shows produced by Thames Television
English-language television shows